"Love Me Not" is a song performed by English rapper Skepta, featuring vocals from Cheb Rabi and B Live. The song features a sample from Murder on the Dancefloor by Sophie Ellis-Bextor. It was released as the fourth single from Skepta's fifth studio album Ignorance Is Bliss on 29 July 2019 through Boy Better Know.

Music video
A music video to accompany the release of "Love Me Not" was first released onto YouTube on 28 July 2019.

Charts

Release history

References

2019 songs
2019 singles
Skepta songs
Songs written by Skepta
Songs written by Sophie Ellis-Bextor
Songs written by Gregg Alexander